The men's 1500 metres event at the 2016 African Championships in Athletics was held on 25 and 26 June in Kings Park Stadium.

Medalists

Results

Heats
Qualification: First 5 of each heat (Q) and the next 2 fastest (q) qualified for the final.

Final

References

2016 African Championships in Athletics
1500 metres at the African Championships in Athletics